Chez Melange was an American seafood restaurant and gastropub located in Redondo Beach, California, which closed on February 29, 2020. It was opened in 1982 and owned and run by Michael Franks and co-owner and head chef Robert Bell.

History
Chez Melange was originally located on Pacific Coast Highway and after the lease was up it moved to its new location in January 2009 on Catalina Avenue.

Chez Melange ran three restaurants at the same Redondo Beach, Catalina Avenue venue, Sea Change, a sea food themed restaurant, Bouzy, a gastropub and The Oyster Bar.

Robert Bell said when first meeting Michael Franks, "I remembered thinking, I don’t want to work with this guy. I’m from Brooklyn, he’s from London. He came from what I thought was an upscale upbringing, I was just off the line of being poor. He went through restaurant school, I barely made it through junior college. But we were both very driven, very passionate about what we were doing, and that’s the only reason we got along."

Chez Melange closed on February 29, 2020.

In 2021 the Chez Melange location was reopened under different ownership as a new restaurant called Table Manners and was later renamed Perfect Storm.

See also
 List of seafood restaurants

References

External links

Gastropubs in California
Defunct restaurants in Greater Los Angeles
Restaurants established in 1982
1982 establishments in California
Defunct seafood restaurants in the United States
Restaurants disestablished in 2020
2020 disestablishments in California